The 2006–07 WRU Division Two West or 2006–07 Asda Division Two West for sponsorship reasons was the sixteenth WRU Division Two West. The season began on Saturday 2 September and ended on Saturday 5 May. Twelve teams played each other on a home and away basis. This was also the last season where teams earned three points for a win and one point for a draw.

Table

Results

Matchday 1

Matchday 2

Matchday 3 (5/6)

Matchday 4

Matchday 5

Matchday 6

Matchday 7 (5/6)

Matchday 8 (5/6)

Matchday 9

Matchday 10 (4/6)

Matchday 11 (1/6)

Matchday 12 (4/6)

Matchday 13

Matchday 14 (5/6)

Matchday 15 (4/6)

Matchday 16

Matchday 17 (5/6)

Matchday 18

Matchday 10 (5/6)

Matchday 19

Matchday 20

Matchday 21

Matchday 22

Mixed matchdays

Mixed matchdays

Mixed matchdays

Mixed matchdays

Matchday 10 (6/6)

Matchday 15 (6/6)

2006–07 in Welsh rugby union
Wales 1